Ivan Lyubimov (born 28 September 1932) is a Russian cross-country skier. He competed at the 1960 Winter Olympics and the 1964 Winter Olympics.

References

1932 births
Living people
Russian male cross-country skiers
Olympic cross-country skiers of the Soviet Union
Cross-country skiers at the 1960 Winter Olympics
Cross-country skiers at the 1964 Winter Olympics
Sportspeople from Pskov